On January 11, 1955, voters in  elected Democrat Paul Rogers to the United States House of Representatives. His father, Dwight L. Rogers, was the incumbent and had just been re-elected to the term in November 1954, but died December 1, 1954.

Results

See also 
 1954 United States House of Representatives elections

Reference

Sources 
 

Florida 1955 06
Florida 1955 06
1955 06
Florida 06
United States House of Representatives 06
United States House of Representatives 1955 06